Stephen Jackson (born 18 September 1956) is a British sprint canoer who competed in the early to mid-1980s. He won two medals at the ICF Canoe Sprint World Championships with a gold (K-2 10000 m: 1983) and a bronze (K-4 10000 m: 1981).

Jackson also finished eighth in the K-1 1000 m event at the 1984 Summer Olympics in Los Angeles.

External links
 
 
 

1956 births
Canoeists at the 1984 Summer Olympics
Living people
Olympic canoeists of Great Britain
ICF Canoe Sprint World Championships medalists in kayak
British male canoeists